Exenterus is a genus of wasps belonging to the family Ichneumonidae.

The genus was first described by Hartig in 1837.

The species of this genus are found in Eurasia and Northern America.

Species:
 Exenterus abruptorius
 Exenterus amictorius
 Exenterus canadensis
 Exenterus confusus
 Exenterus walleyi
 Exenterus tsugae
 Exenterus platypes
 Exenterus pini
 Exenterus nigrifrons
 Exenterus affinis

References

Ichneumonidae